The Mount Edgecombe Ganesha Temple is a provincial heritage site in Inanda (eThekwini Metropolitan Municipality) in the KwaZulu-Natal province of South Africa.

In 1977, it was described in the Government Gazette as

References
 South African Heritage Resource Agency database

Hindu temples in South Africa
Religious buildings and structures in South Africa
Buildings and structures in KwaZulu-Natal
eThekwini Metropolitan Municipality

1899 establishments in the Colony of Natal
Ganesha temples